Aulus Atilius Caiatinus (or Calatinus;  258–241 BC) was a Roman general and statesman who achieved prominence for his military activities during the First Punic War against Carthage. As consul in 258 BC, he enjoyed several successes in Sicily, for which he later celebrated a triumph. He undertook further campaigning in Sicily both at sea and on land during a second consulship (254 BC) and then as dictator (249 BC), becoming the first Roman dictator to lead an army outside mainland Italy.

Atilius held the office of censor in 247, the crowning achievement of a public career at the time. He later dedicated temples to Spes and Fides at Rome.

Biography

Background and family
Aulus Atilius Caiatinus, or Calatinus, probably belonged to an aristocratic family from Campania which had been welcomed to Roman high society following the region's conquest by Rome during the Samnite Wars in the 4th century BC. The surname Caiatinus (or Calatinus) indicates that an ancestor came from, or held estates near, the Campanian town of Caiatia (or Calatia). The plebeian clan of the Atilii soon began attaining the highest offices of the Roman state, reaching a high point in its prestige around the time of the First Punic War (264–241 BC), with the successful careers of Atilius Caiatinus and several relatives of his (like Marcus Atilius Regulus and Gaius Atilius Bulbus).

Friedrich Münzer, in his influential study of the role of family relationships in Roman Republican politics, argued that this quick rise to prominence was the result of an alliance with the long-established patrician clan of the Fabii. Atilius Caiatinus himself seems to have been a maternal grandson of Fabius Rullianus, one of Rome's heroes during the Samnite Wars; his parents' marriage is one of the earliest recorded unions between patricians and plebeians. Oakley dated his birth around 300–295 BC.

First Punic War

Atilius was one of the Roman consuls in 258 BC, alongside Gaius Sulpicius Paterculus, and was sent to Sicily to conduct the war there against the Carthaginians. Joining the previous year's consul, Gaius Aquillius Florus, he first went to Panormus (Palermo) to draw out some Punic troops who had been wintering there, and, when this failed, he moved on to Hippana and promptly took it by storm. Atilius afterward resumed the siege of Mytistraton, which Florus had tried to take without success the previous year, and obtained its surrender after the Carthaginian garrison withdrew during the night. The city was plundered and burnt to the ground, its inhabitants slaughtered or enslaved.

The ancient sources go on to report a story which has Atilius being ambushed at a narrow mountain pass while on the way to attack Camarina, only to be saved by the self-sacrifice of a tribune and 300 men, who held the enemy off until Atilius could extricate his army from danger, though the historicity of this anecdote has been doubted. Camarina itself was taken, as was Enna, the latter through treachery. An attempt by Atilius to seize the island of Lipara ended in failure. His command in Sicily continued through 257 BC with his election (presumably ) to the office of praetor, though he and his fellow commander Cornelius Blasio, one of the consuls, seem to have accomplished nothing worth of note this year. For his successes in 258, Atilius celebrated a triumph back at Rome on 19 January 256 BC.

Atilius was elected consul for a second time in 254 BC, probably chosen for his experience. He and his colleague in office, Cornelius Scipio Asina, at the head of a newly built fleet, sailed to Sicily and took Cephaloedium by treachery, but their subsequent attack on Drepana was repulsed by the Carthaginian Carthalo. The Romans then captured Panormus and other towns, though only the consul Scipio later celebrated a triumph for these victories; Lazenby suggests that this was because the consuls split their forces, with Scipio in charge of Panormus, the main target, while Atilius led the unsuccessful attack on Drepana, perhaps as a diversion. The consuls then withdrew to Messana, and Atilius then to Rome, taking the fleet with him.

In 249 BC, Atilius was appointed dictator in the aftermath of the Roman disaster at the naval Battle of Drepana. His deputy or 'master of the horse' was Lucius Caecilius Metellus. He was sent to Sicily, where he did not achieve anything remarkable, though this made him the first Roman dictator to lead an army outside of Italy.

Later life
Atilius was elected censor in 247 BC, as the plebeian counterpart to the patrician Aulus Manlius Torquatus Atticus. A factor in his election may have been his kinship to one of that year's consuls, Numerius Fabius. In the census conducted during their censorship 241,212 adult male Roman citizens were recorded. This was a sharp decline from the number recorded in the 252 BC census – 297,797 – indicating the heavy toll that the war with Carthage had taken on the Roman population.

In 241 BC Atilius mediated a dispute between two commanders, the proconsul Lutatius Catulus and the propraetor Valerius Falto, regarding whom should celebrate a triumph for the Roman victory at the Battle of the Aegates. Brennan said that "there was simply no other man in Rome so qualified to judge" the dispute, with him having had a distinguished career and obtained the highest military and state honors. Atilius seems to have ruled the case in favor of Catulus, though in the end both parties celebrated triumphs.

Atilius dedicated a temple to Spes in the Forum Holitorium and another to Fides on the Capitoline Hill. His tomb was located at the Porta Capena, and Cicero preserves part of his epitaph.

Notes

Citations

References
 
 
 
 
 
 
 
 
 

3rd-century BC deaths
3rd-century BC Roman consuls
3rd-century BC Roman praetors
Caiatinus, Aulus
Roman censors
Roman commanders of the First Punic War
Ancient Roman dictators
Roman triumphators
Year of birth unknown
Year of death uncertain